A facial expression database is a collection of images or video clips with facial expressions of a range of emotions.
Well-annotated (emotion-tagged) media content of facial behavior is essential for training, testing, and validation of algorithms for the development of expression recognition systems. The emotion annotation can be done in discrete emotion labels or on a continuous scale. Most of the databases are usually based on the basic emotions theory (by Paul Ekman) which assumes the existence of six discrete basic emotions (anger, fear, disgust, surprise, joy, sadness). However, some databases include the emotion tagging in continuous arousal-valence scale.

In posed expression databases, the participants are asked to display different basic emotional expressions, while in spontaneous expression database, the expressions are natural. Spontaneous expressions differ from posed ones remarkably in terms of intensity, configuration, and duration. Apart from this, synthesis of some AUs are barely achievable without undergoing the associated emotional state. Therefore, in most cases, the posed expressions are exaggerated, while the spontaneous ones are subtle and differ in appearance.

Many publicly available databases are categorized here. Here are some details of the facial expression databases.

References

Facial expressions